Armeria juniperifolia, the juniper-leaved thrift, is a species of flowering plant in the family Plumbaginaceae. It is a mat-forming evergreen perennial, with pale pink clover-like flowers appearing in Spring above dark green, needle-like foliage. Numerous cultivars have been developed for garden use, where it is suitable for cultivation in the alpine or rock garden.

This species  and the cultivar 'Bevan's Variety'  have gained the Royal Horticultural Society's Award of Garden Merit.

References

juniperifolia